The Beijing International Women's Ekiden was an annual, international ekiden (marathon relay) road running competition held in Beijing, China. Formed in 1991 as the Great Wall International Ekiden Relay, the competition featured a six-stage relay race for women from 1991 to 2005, and included a men's race once, at its final edition. The race format had first, third and fifth legs at five kilometres in distance, second and fourth legs over ten kilometres, and a sixth and final leg covering the remaining 7.195 km of the classic marathon distance.

The host nation China was the most successful team, winning nine of the fifteen runnings of the women's race. The women's course record of 2:11:41 was set by the Chinese team in 1998. Kenya was the sole men's winner, in 2:04:17 hours in 2005.

Editions

Medallists

Men

Women

References

International athletics competitions hosted by China
Sports competitions in Beijing
Defunct athletics competitions
Long-distance relay races
1991 establishments in China
2005 disestablishments in China
Recurring sporting events established in 1991
Recurring events disestablished in 2005
Women in Beijing